Anton Peterlin may refer to:

Anton Peterlin (physicist) (1908–1993), Slovene physicist
Anton Peterlin (soccer) (born 1987), American soccer player